Victory Van Tuyl (born September 16, 1995) is an American actress with some of her roles include Teri Forman on the Nickelodeon series Marvin Marvin. She recently starred in the independent film, Bedeviled, which had a theatrical release of August 11, 2017.

Early years
Van Tuyl was born in Atlanta, Georgia and grew up in Indian Hill, Ohio, a suburb of Cincinnati. At age 11, she moved back to Atlanta and began acting in community theatre, starring in several productions, including A Christmas Carol, Hansel and Gretel, Ramona Quimby and Will Rogers Follies. She signed with an agent and began traveling the Southeast, appearing in a number of independent films, such as Winter’s Tale, Magellan, and the lead role in Magic in the Forest.

Career
Van Tuyl and her family relocated to Los Angeles in 2011 to better pursue her acting career. Shortly after arriving she landed a recurring role as Julie on the Nickelodeon series Supah Ninjas. She also appeared in The Aquabats! Super Show!. Nickelodeon then offered her the part of Teri, one of the lead roles in the network’s new series, Marvin Marvin. In it she starred alongside YouTube-sensation-turned-TV-star Lucas Cruikshank, who portrayed a space alien sent to live on Earth. Van Tuyl played his human sister who helped him navigate life as a typical American teenager.  She starred in all twenty episodes of the entire Marvin Marvin series. She appeared in Season 6 of the ABC series Castle, playing the role of Kris Howard in the episode “Smells like Teen Spirit.” In 2014 she starred in the independent film The Stable Boy, which is in post-production. Some of Van Tuyl’s other credits include the 2009 movie Zombieland and a L'Oréal commercial as the daughter of Julianna Margulies.

Awards
In 2013 Van Tuyl was nominated for a Young Artist Award in the category of Best Performance in a TV Series (Comedy or Drama) - Leading Young Actress for her performance in Marvin Marvin.

Filmography

References

External links

1995 births
American child actresses
American film actresses
American television actresses
Living people
Actresses from Atlanta
People from Indian Hill, Ohio
Actresses from Ohio
21st-century American actresses